Sabrevois may refer to several places in Québec, Canada:

 Sabrevois, a village of Sainte-Anne-de-Sabrevois (parish municipality), MRC Le Haut-Richelieu Regional County Municipality, Montérégie
 Sabrevois Park, public park of Boucherville (City), Montérégie
 Sabrevois River, stream in Boucherville (City), Montérégie
 Seigneurie Sabrevois, Saint-Sébastien (Municipalité), MRC Le Haut-Richelieu Regional County Municipality, Montérégie
 Sainte-Anne-de-Sabrevois, municipality MRC Le Haut-Richelieu Regional County Municipality, Montérégie

People

Fictional
 Marie de Sabrevois, a character in Kenneth Roberts' Arundel novels (1929, 1933)